Awapuni is the name of three distinct places in New Zealand:
Awapuni, Gisborne is a suburb of Gisborne city
Awapuni, Palmerston North is a suburb of Palmerston North city
Awapuni, Wellington is a suburb of Lower Hutt city